The Pool is a 2018 Thai survival thriller film directed by Ping Lumpraploeng, starring Theeradej Wongpuapan and Ratnamon Ratchiratham. The film revolves around a couple who is trapped in a 6 meter deep pool after the water is drained out. Their situation worsens when a alligator enters the pool with them. It received positive reviews.

Plot 
The film opens with Day laying in a drained pool with several injuries to his body. He looks down and screams as a alligator bites down on his leg. 

In a flashback, Day is working on a photoshoot in the same pool as in the opening, now full of water. His girlfriend Koi and his dog Lucky wait for him to finish. 

The following morning, Day clears the pool of the props used for the photoshoot and relaxes on an inflatable raft, Lucky is tied to a leash nearby. He is advised by his boss that the pool is being drained, so he will need to get out soon. Day ends up falling asleep, and by the time he wakes up, the water level is too low for him to get out. He attempts to climb out, only to severely injure the nail of his right index finger. He screams for help, but no one is around to hear him.

The next day, while Day is asleep on the raft, Koi shows up to surprise him. Not noticing the lowered water level, she prepares to jump off the diving board. Day awakens and shouts for her not to jump, startling her and causing her to slip and fall into the pool, hitting her head on the diving board on the way down. Day pulls her onto the raft and tends to her while she is unconscious. That night a alligator appears and crawls towards Lucky but slips on some metal poles by the side of the pool and falls in.

By the morning, the water has completely drained. Day discovers a positive pregnancy test in Koi's pocket and must fend off attacks from the alligator, revealed to be a pregnant female when it lays a brood of eggs the following night. 

Day and Koi fight against hunger, the heat, and a ferocious mother alligator in order to survive.

Cast 

 Theeradej Wongpuapan as Day
 Ratnamon Ratchiratham as Koi

Reception 
The review aggregation website Rotten Tomatoes offers as "Fresh" a score of 96% from 23 critics, and a rating average of 7.23 out of 10.

References

2018 films
2018 thriller films
Thai-language films
2010s survival films
Thai thriller films